image+nation. LGBTQueer Montreal is an annual eleven-day film festival, which takes place in Montreal, Quebec, Canada. Held in November each year, the festival is dedicated to sharing the stories and experiences of LGBTQ+ people and is the first festival of its kind in Canada.

History 
Launched in 1987, the festival's mission is to represent, protect and prepare the present and future generations of queer storytellers and media makers while building empathy through sharing stories with audiences in Canada and throughout the world.

Each year the festival screens the best of local and international queer cinema at various Montréal venues, focusing on new voices and evolving means of storytelling in contemporary culture. Many of the early films and activist videos screened at image+nation. LGBTQueer Montreal dealt with resistance, liberation, AIDS and HIV. During this pre-internet era, it was difficult for festival organizers to find films and videos to present until an LGBTQ+ festival circuit began in the early ’90s, coinciding with the indie “New Queer Cinema” movement.

In 2016, the festival developed a series of educational and mentoring programs dedicated to nurturing emerging content, under the name of I+N Explore (fka I+N ProLab).

The 30th anniversary of image+nation. LGBTQueer Montreal festival took place in 2017 with 120 features, documentaries, shorts and queer favourites. Venues included the Imperial Theatre, the Montreal Museum of Fine Arts, Concordia's J.A. de Sève Cinema, the Phi Centre and the Cinémathèque québécoise.

The event's programming director is Katharine Setzer, and its executive director is Charlie Boudreau.

Awards and prizes 

 Jury Prize
 Special Jury Award
 Audience Award

See also
 List of LGBT film festivals
 List of film festivals in Canada

References

External links

Film festivals in Montreal
LGBT film festivals in Canada
LGBT culture in Montreal
1987 establishments in Quebec